Anthony Aibel is an American director, actor, writer, producer and former musical director. He is also an acting coach who works with known and upcoming actors internationally; he won a special award from the Juilliard School for his educational work. Aibel is currently producing and directing several new series on the Shock TV Channel, under the umbrella of Willing & Aibel Productions, LLC.

He is also recognized for his shows at Carnegie Hall and The Kennedy Center that featured artists such as EGOT winner Rita Moreno, Rosemary Clooney, The Tonight Show’s Doc Severinson, and Al Jarreau, and as the musical director for Area 31, which received a Grammy Award nomination.

Aibel was invited to be a guest on Live at Five. He made acting appearances in productions directed by Oscar winners Costa-Gavras and Martin Scorsese. He is directing a series which includes as a guest star the Emmy Award and Tony Award winner Judd Hirsch, who has a supporting role in the new Steven Spielberg film The Fabelmans.

Early life and education
Aibel was born in New York City to pianist/festival director Olegna Fuschi and pianist Howard Aibel; they are also professors of music. Aibel’s maternal grandfather was the inventor Antonio Fuschi, and his paternal grandfather Louis Aibel was a medical doctor. His grandmothers Creta Vir Den and Sylvia Aibel were both musicians. His uncle is the entertainment attorney Donald J. Aibel, and he has two cousins who are also in the entertainment industry: Vineyard Theatre Artistic Director/Casting Director Douglas Aibel and DreamWorks writer/producer Jonathan Aibel.  Aibel grew up with the highly accomplished actuary, Hayden Burrus. When he was four years old he performed one of his first acting roles when he told Burrus (also four years old) "I have to tell you something... I'm moving to China." Aibel also grew up with his cousin Matthew Aibel, a licensed clinical social worker on Long Island.

At the age of six, Aibel landed his first lead role in a play while a student at the Riverdale Country School, an alma mater of John F. Kennedy. He continued getting lead roles in most of the school's plays and musicals, several directed by Emmy winner Ian Ellis James. At age eight, he began to sing professionally in the children's chorus of the Metropolitan Opera, and at age 11, was a vocal soloist at Lincoln Center.

At age 16, Aibel was one of the youngest college students ever accepted to the Juilliard School, where he studied music directing, directing, acting and composition, as well as voice and violin/viola, earning his Master’s Degree along with the nickname "Master of Some."

Aibel also studied acting for several years at T. Schreiber Studio with Terry Schreiber, who taught, among others, Edward Norton, Maria Bello, and Peter Sarsgaard. Aibel was also accepted into the Juilliard exchange program with Columbia University, where he studied literature, philosophy, and writing, and was accepted into Tanglewood, where he studied with five-time Oscar Winner John Williams and with Leonard Bernstein, best known for West Side Story.

Career
At the age of 23, Aibel became one of the youngest professional music directors in the United States, often acting or narrating while on the podium. He was a speaker and performer at seven events in Carnegie Hall, as well as for shows at the State University of New York at Purchase and the Kennedy Center. One show had Aibel leading the soundtrack of John Williams' Star Wars with a light saber while doing voice-overs for the part of Darth Vader.

Aibel has worked with ICM Artists (now known as ICM Partners) and acted in the Costa-Gavras film Mad City starring Dustin Hoffman. He led shows at the Kennedy Center that featured multi-talented artists such as EGOT winner Rita Moreno, Rosemary Clooney, The Tonight Show’s Doc Severinson, and Al Jarreau. He was also the musical director for Area 31, which received a Grammy Award Nomination at the 48th Annual Grammy Awards. Anthony Aibel also received an award from the American Society of Composers, Authors and Publishers (ASCAP).

Aibel acted in an episode of HBO’s Boardwalk Empire, directed by Martin Scorsese. In 2014 and 2015, he filled in as a musician on Broadway, performing Bernstein's On the Town at the Lyric Theatre. Aibel has been invited to give acting master classes since 2016. In 2020, he began writing, producing, directing and acting in several series for the Shock TV Channel, which launches in Fall of 2022. One of the guest stars is Emmy Award and Golden Globe Award winner Judd Hirsch.

References

External links

Living people
American male actors
Male actors from New York City
Juilliard School alumni
Year of birth missing (living people)
American musical theatre directors